The Eastside Baptist Church in Okmulgee, Oklahoma is a historic Baptist church located at 219 N. Osage Avenue.

It is home to a congregation established in 1903 as the Zion Bethel Church, which met at a frame residence at the location of the present church. The church was built in 1921 and was added to the National Register in 1984.

It is on the National Register of Historic Places listings in Okmulgee County, Oklahoma.  The building was deemed significant as the second oldest black church building in Okmulgee, and one of the "oldest unaltered black churches in eastern Oklahoma."

References

African-American history of Oklahoma
Baptist churches in Oklahoma
Churches on the National Register of Historic Places in Oklahoma
Churches completed in 1921
Buildings and structures in Okmulgee County, Oklahoma
National Register of Historic Places in Okmulgee County, Oklahoma
1921 establishments in Oklahoma